The 2005–06 PFF National League (now known as PFF League) was the 2nd season of Pakistan Football Federation League, second tier of Pakistan Football Federation. The season started on 28 December 2005 and concluded on 4 February 2006.

Groups

Group A

Group B

Group C

Group D

Final round

Group 1

Group 2

Semi-finals

Third-Place

Final

References

Pakistan Football Federation League seasons
2005–06 in Pakistani football